FK Hodonín is a Czech football club located in the town of Hodonín. It currently plays in the Czech Fourth Division.

Hodonín won promotion to the Moravian–Silesian Football League in 2017, passing rivals ČSK Uherský Brod on the last day of the season with a 12–2 win over Bystřice nad Pernštejnem to finish first in group D of the Czech Fourth Division. In 2019 the club was relegated to the Czech Fourth Division.

Czech Cup
The team reached the third round of the Czech Cup in 2017–18, defeating Vítkovice 1–0 in the second round.

References

External links
 Official website 

Football clubs in the Czech Republic
Association football clubs established in 1994
Hodonín